Leptosiaphos koutoui is a species of skink, a lizard in the family Scincidae. The species is  endemic to Cameroon and is only known from the Adamaoua Massif near Meiganga.

Etymology
The specific name, koutoui, is in honor of Denis Koulagna Koutou, former Director of Wildlife and Protected Areas in Cameroon.

Reproduction
L. koutoui is oviparous.

References

Leptosiaphos
Skinks of Africa
Reptiles of Cameroon
Endemic fauna of Cameroon
Reptiles described in 2004
Taxa named by Ivan Ineich
Taxa named by Andreas Schmitz
Taxa named by Laurent Chirio
Taxa named by Matthew Lebreton